Aida Xenia El-Khadra is a particle physicist who is a Professor of High Energy Physics at the University of Illinois at Urbana–Champaign. She is the co-chair of the Muon g-2 Theory Initiative, which reported hints at new physics in the Standard Model in 2021. She is a Fellow of the American Physical Society and the Alfred P. Sloan Foundation.

Early life and education 
El-Khadra was an undergraduate student at the Free University of Berlin, where she earned a master's degree in physics. She moved to the University of California, Los Angeles for her doctoral research, where she studied semi-leptonic decays. El-Khadra was a postdoctoral researcher at the Brookhaven National Laboratory, Fermilab, and the Ohio State University.

Research and career 
In 1995, El-Khadra joined the faculty at the University of Illinois at Urbana–Champaign, where she was promoted to Professor in 2008. Her research makes use of quantum chromodynamics to understand processes in flavor physics. She spent 1998 as a Fellow at the Center for Advanced Study, where she developed and tested new lattice actions. El-Khadra directs the Fermilab Lattice collaboration, and was named a Distinguished Scholar at Fermilab in 2016.

El-Khadra oversaw the theoretical aspects of the Muon g-2 experiments. The collaboration measured the magnetic moment of the muon with unparalleled precision. El-Khadra has been involved with several theoretical attempts to predict the anomalous magnetic moment based on the Standard Model. In 2021, the experimental component of the collaboration reported a magnetic moment that was considerably larger than the value predicted by the Standard Model. This finding hints at new particles or forces in the Standard Model.

Awards and honors 
El-Khadra was elected Fellow of the American Physical Society in 2011 "for contributions to lattice QCD and flavor physics including pioneering studies of heavy quarks on the lattice, semileptonic and leptonic heavy-light meson decays, the strong coupling constant, and quark masses". She was named to the 2021 class of Fellows of the American Association for the Advancement of Science. In 2022 she was awarded a Simons Fellowship.

Selected publications

References 

Living people
Year of birth missing (living people)
Free University of Berlin alumni
University of Illinois Urbana-Champaign faculty
University of California, Los Angeles alumni
Particle physicists
Brookhaven National Laboratory staff
Ohio State University people
Fellows of the American Physical Society
Fellows of the American Association for the Advancement of Science
Women physicists